Prince of Belvedair is the second studio album by German rapper Kay One, known from his work with German rapper Bushido.
The album was released on March 16, 2012, by ersguterjunge as Standard and Premium Edition under Bushido's label ersguterjunge.

The first single released from the album was titled "I Need A Girl (Part Three)" which features American singer Mario Winans and reached number 239 in the German Albums Chart. The music video for "I Need A Girl (Part Three)" reached 8 million views on YouTube.

The album name is a reference to The Fresh Prince of Bel-Air, an American television sitcom.

Track listing
All tracks were produced by Beatzarre and Djorkaeff, except track 2 ("Prince of Belvadair") was produced by 3Nity and Abaz, and track 3 ("Besser im Bett") was produced by Abaz.

Singles
"I Need A Girl (Part Three)" was released as first single from album on March 2, 2012.
It was recorded in Berlin, in studio of producer Beatzarre.
The musicvideo of the song was filmed in Miami and actually reached over 8 million views on YouTube.

In German charts, the single reached position 29 and in Austrian charts it reached position 44.
In Swiss charts, the single took position 39.

The bonus track on the release was the song "Rain On You".

Charts
The album reached the fourth position in German Media Control charts. In Austria and Swiss the album reached on position 7. The video to "I Need A Girl Part 3" actually reached over 8 million views. The video to "Rain on You" actually reached over 3 million views.

Weekly charts

Year-end charts

Links
http://www.musicline.de/de/product/Kay+One/Prince+Of+Belvedair-Standard/CD///886919503920
https://www.amazon.de/Prince-Belvedair-Premium-Edition-inkl/dp/B006ZL4HIO
https://itunes.apple.com/de/album/prince-of-belvedair-premium/id503508767
https://www.amazon.de/Need-Girl-Feat-Mario-Winans/dp/B00742F4MG/ref=sr_1_1?s=music&ie=UTF8&qid=1352652393&sr=1-1
https://www.youtube.com/watch?v=SiuGh1RiVxM
https://www.youtube.com/watch?v=QrGg2LVvTYs

References

2012 albums